Ritche Lago Bautista (born June 14, 1977 in Manila, Philippines) is a Filipino American actor, best known as a principal actor in The Learning Channel television show Untold Stories of the ER in a 2005 episode called "Prepare for the Worst" in which he plays a muscular gangster banging on a hospital window.

Filmography 

Epic Movie (2007)

Daft Punk's Electroma (2006)

Jimmy Kimmel Live! (2006) (TV)

Entourage (2005) TV Series

Herbie: Fully Loaded (2005)

Jarhead (2005)

Las Vegas (2005) TV Series
  
Medium (2005) TV Series
 
Untold Stories of the ER (2005) TV Series

R-Generation (2004)

Other works 

Commercial for Mitsubishi
Music Video for Avenged Sevenfold
Music Video for Seether

External links 

1977 births
American male film actors
Living people
Male actors from Metro Manila